Enteromius luluae is a species of ray-finned fish in the genus Enteromius from the Democratic Republic of the Congo.

Footnotes 

 

Enteromius
Taxa named by Henry Weed Fowler
Fish described in 1930
Endemic fauna of the Democratic Republic of the Congo